The Vršič Pass, with an elevation of , is a high mountain pass across the Julian Alps in northwestern Slovenia. It is the highest pass in Slovenia, as well as the highest in the Eastern Julian Alps. It connects Upper Carniola with the Trenta Valley in the Slovene Littoral. The road across the pass, now known as Russian Road, was originally built for military purposes in the early 19th century and followed an earlier trade route. The Vršič Pass is considered an excellent starting point for excursions to surrounding peaks.

Name
The Slovene common noun  literally means 'little peak', a diminutive form of the word  'peak'. The name  was not applied to the pass until 1911. The name of the peak was first attested in written sources as Werschez in 1763–87. The Italian name of the pass was Moistrocca.

History

After World War I, from 1918 to World War II, the Vršič Pass was on the border between Italy and Yugoslavia. Since 1945, together with the Upper Isonzo Valley north of Gorizia, it was incorporated in Yugoslavia, and then in Slovenia.

Hiking
The Vršič Pass is considered an excellent starting point for excursions to surrounding peaks, including Mala Mojstrovka, Velika Mojstrovka, Planja, Prisojnik (Prisank), Razor, Šitna Glava, Slemenova Špica, Sovna Glava, and Suhi Vrh, or shorter hikes in the immediate area.

Several mountain lodges are located near the pass: the Erjavec Lodge, the Tičar Lodge,  Mike's Lodge, the Forest Lodge, and the Postman's Lodge.

Road
The road through the pass rises from Kranjska Gora in a series of 50 hairpin bends, traverses the top of the Vršič Pass, and descends into the Soča Valley. The upper elevations of the road are rendered impassable by heavy snowfall during much of winter. The road was greatly improved in late 1915 to supply the Isonzo Front of World War I, and it was originally named after Archduke Eugen of Austria-Hungary. The current name, Russian Road, refers to the approximately ten thousand Russian prisoners of war used as laborers in the 1915 construction.

Monuments

On the south side of the pass there is a bronze monument in honor of the mountaineer and writer Julius Kugy, work by the architect Boris Kobe and the sculptor Jakob Savinšek. It was erected in 1953.

Gallery

See also
 List of highest paved roads in Europe
 List of mountain passes

References

Mountain passes of Slovenia
Mountain passes of the Julian Alps
Municipality of Bovec
Municipality of Kranjska Gora